The 1979–80 season was Newport County's 18th consecutive season in the Football League Fourth Division and their 52nd season overall in the Football League.

It was one of the most successful seasons in County's history. Finishing in third place in the Fourth Division the club attained promotion to the Football League Third Division for the 1980–81 season. After winning the Welsh Cup this season, County also earned a place in the UEFA Cup Winners' Cup for the 1980–81 season.

Season review

Results summary

Results by round

Fixtures and results

Fourth Division

FA Cup

Football League Cup

Welsh Cup

Final

First Leg

MATCH RULES
90 minutes.
30 minutes of extra-time if necessary.
Replay if scores still level.
One named substitute.
Maximum of one substitution.

Second Leg

MATCH RULES
90 minutes.
30 minutes of extra-time if necessary.
Replay if scores still level.
One named substitute.
Maximum of one substitution.

League table

P = Matches played; W = Matches won; D = Matches drawn; L = Matches lost; F = Goals for; A = Goals against; GD = Goal difference; Pts = Points

External links
 Newport County 1979-1980 : Results
 Newport County football club match record: 1980
 English Division Four (old) 1979-1980 : Table
 WELSH CUP FINAL 1979/80
 WELSH CUP 1979/80

1979-80
English football clubs 1979–80 season
1979–80 in Welsh football